Jamb (BK) is a village in Mukhed taluka of Nanded district in the Indian state of Maharashtra.

In 2011, the village had a population of 6,303 with literacy rate of 75% and sex ratio of 966.

The village has a Primary Health Centre.

References

Villages in Nanded district